WBAG (1150 AM) is a radio station broadcasting a News/Talk format to the Burlington, North Carolina, United States, area. The station is licensed to Gray Broadcasting LLC.

WBAG uses a Broadcast Electronics AM1 transmitter running 1,000 watts during the day and 48 watts at night. The studio, transmitter and tower are located on Burch Bridge Road.

On February 24, 1947 at 2 P.M. "1150 Radio" began broadcasting using the callsign WFNS. The station was started by Lawrence Neese Sr., Bowman Sanders, Bill Coble, Homer Andrews, Rufus Blanchard and Everette Quails. These six local businessmen formed the Burlington and Graham Broadcasting Company as the ownership entity (Graham is an adjacent town).

The original studios and offices were located on Andrews Street at Main Street in downtown Burlington. The transmitter and tower were located on Burch Bridge Road.

In 1964, the callsign was changed to WBAG, meaning We're Burlington And Graham. At the same time, the format was changed to a new "Top 40" music format. In 1970, WBAG moved to a new facility at 939 South Main Street in Burlington.

In 1983, The Village Companies purchased the Burlington and Graham Broadcasting Company and moved the FM station, now WNCB, to Raleigh. WBAG (AM) remained in Burlington under the ownership of a newly formed corporation, Falcon Communications Inc.

In the mid-80s, the format switched to adult standards from Stardust. WBAG also used the Westwood One standards and Music of Your Life formats during recent years, as well as playing locally originating beach music and oldies.

The station changed ownership two more times before being acquired in 2000 by Gray Broadcasting LLC, headed by Joe Gray. New studios and offices were constructed at 1745 Burch Bridge Road where the transmitter and tower were already located.

Since the beginning of the station, it has carried over 60 years of a live broadcast of the Sunday Morning worship service of the First Baptist Church in Burlington. The station also has covered Tar Heel sports for over sixty years, as well as local high school sports and NASCAR.

In 2016, WBAG began rebroadcasting on FM via translator W290CX, 105.9 FM.

References

External links

BAG
Full service radio stations in the United States